David John Trone (born September 21, 1955) is an American politician and businessman serving as the U.S. representative for Maryland's 6th congressional district. The district includes most of the western third of the state, but the bulk of its population is in the outer northern suburbs of Washington, D.C. Trone founded and co-owns Total Wine & More with his brother, and served as the company's president until December 2016.

In 2016, Trone spent more than $13 million of his own money on his unsuccessful Democratic primary campaign to succeed Chris Van Hollen in Maryland's 8th congressional district, setting a record for the most expensive self-funded House campaign. In 2018, Trone was the Democratic nominee for the 6th district and won the general election to succeed John Delaney.

Early life and education  
Trone was born in Maryland and raised on a  farm in East Berlin, Pennsylvania, where his father Thomas ran a chicken and hog operation. Thomas also owned a soda and beer store. When Trone's parents separated, his father kept the farm and his mother took over the store. Thomas and his farm went into bankruptcy, but Trone kept working at his mother's store.

Trone graduated magna cum laude, Phi Beta Kappa, from Furman University in 1977, and earned a Master of Business Administration in 1985 from the Wharton School of the University of Pennsylvania.

Career

Total Wine & More 

Having seen the potential of the beer sales at his mother's store, Trone began his career by founding the beer-only retailer Beer World in Pennsylvania in 1984, during his second semester of graduate school. Months before graduating from Wharton, in 1985, Trone expanded into the Pittsburgh metropolitan area. Over time, he opened additional stores, called Beer and Pop Warehouse and, later, Beer World, which were owned by friends and family members because Pennsylvania state law prohibited individuals from owning more than one beer retail outlet.

Trone, with his brother Robert's help, opened two stores in Delaware in 1991, adding wine and spirits to the company's offerings. Using knowledge acquired at Wharton, the brothers chose to replicate the family store's model across Pennsylvania. The beverage company had slim margins, but was immediately profitable and allowed the brothers to focus on operations. They familiarized themselves with regulators and industry leaders, and began changing laws that restrict wholesalers from offering retailers discounts in exchange for large volume purchases, among others, in their attempt to promote beverage consumption.

The business has since expanded into what is known today as Total Wine & More, the largest privately owned beer, wine, and spirits retailer in the U.S.  In December 2016, Trone gave up his title of president to chief executive Kevin Peters.

Arrests and indictments
Beginning in 1989 and over the next three years, Pennsylvania authorities arrested Trone three times following complaints from an association of smaller, individually owned stores. One arrest was for negotiating volume discounts on behalf of multiple stores and illegally advertising beer prices, and one was for circumventing state transportation regulations. The charges were later dismissed.

In 1992, a grand jury in Dauphin County, Pennsylvania, indicted Trone, his wife, June, and his brother for owning multiple stores through Trone's consulting company, among other charges, all of which were later dropped and expunged. In 1994, a state judge dismissed 19 of the 23 counts based on "prosecutorial overreaching", and the remaining counts were withdrawn after Trone paid a $40,000 fee to cover investigation costs.

During these legal proceedings, the Bureau of Alcohol, Tobacco, Firearms and Explosives (ATF) broke the law by providing records of his consulting firm to government officials, prompting Trone to sue the agency in federal court. He won and was awarded $400,000. The lawyer who had represented Trone also served as a national board member of the American Civil Liberties Union (ACLU), which began a long-term relationship between Trone and the ACLU. The Trones' difficulties in Pennsylvania prompted them to leave the state; Total Wine & More grew from the remaining two stores in Delaware and an additional retail outlet in New Jersey, which Trone had opened in the early 1990s.

In 2016, the Massachusetts Alcoholic Beverages Control Commission served Total Wine with a license suspension for selling liquor below its costs. The company appealed the commission's decision, and in 2017 the Suffolk Superior Court sided with Total Wine.

U.S. House of Representatives

Elections

2016 

Trone has been active in Democratic politics and hosted fundraisers for the party. In 2014, he hosted a fundraiser for gubernatorial candidate Anthony Brown that former president Bill Clinton attended, and in November 2015, he held a fundraiser at his home for the Democratic National Committee, which President Obama attended. Trone also contributed to Republican politicians; according to OpenSecrets, he donated more than $150,000 to Republicans in multiple U.S. states between 2000 and 2015. The Washington Post reported that Trone contributed more than $90,000 to Democratic state officials during the same period, and said the donations made to Republicans were to support "legislation or regulatory changes favorable to his company". Trone said the donations "represented the cost of doing business, especially in states with Republican-controlled state houses and governor's mansions".

In January 2016, Trone entered the Democratic primary campaign to succeed Chris Van Hollen in Maryland's 8th congressional district; this was the real contest in the heavily Democratic district. He ran on reducing unemployment and gun violence, criminal justice reform, environmental protection, and education and foreign policy. Trone pledged to support early education, work with the National Institutes of Health to reduce health care costs, improve infrastructure, and forgive more student loans for government employees.

Trone spent more than $13 million on his unsuccessful campaign, which became the most expensive self-funded House campaign ever. The first-time candidate said a large personal investment was necessary in order to stand out in a crowded race that included well-known rivals, including news anchor and Marriott International executive Kathleen Matthews and the winner, State Senator Jamie Raskin. After the election, Trone told NPR, "We knew it would be very expensive. We're not surprised by what it cost at all. We anticipated that, and it was a thoughtful choice my wife and I made... It was the right decision to take no money from anybody."

2018 

On August 2, 2017, Trone announced his candidacy for the Democratic nomination for Maryland's 6th district, an open seat being vacated by John Delaney, who chose not to seek reelection and retire from Congress to focus on his 2020 presidential campaign. Trone had endorsed Delaney for president several days earlier. He told Washington Jewish Week in early 2018 that lessons learned from his previous run included entering the race earlier and raising money.

Trone toured Maryland in late 2017, and filed his candidacy in January 2018. His filing was accompanied by a press release expressing his support for education, environmental protections, health care, Social Security, and women's rights. Trone  also made combating the opioid epidemic a central focus of his platform, releasing an action plan and hosting a series of town hall meetings to address the crisis. In March 2018, Trone, gubernatorial candidate Rushern Baker, and John Delaney organized free bus trips from Maryland to Washington, D.C., in support of the March for Our Lives demonstration.

Trone was endorsed by Baker, Joanne C. Benson, Anthony Brown, and Doug Duncan.

On June 26, 2018, Trone won the Democratic primary election for Maryland's 6th district against seven challengers with 40% of the vote.

In the general election, Trone faced Republican Amie Hoeber and candidates from other parties. He was endorsed by the Washington Post. On November 6, 2018, Trone was elected with 57.5% of the vote.

2020 

On January 23, 2020, Trone announced his intention to run for reelection to Congress.

In the general election, Trone defeated Republican nominee Neil Parrott and candidates from other parties with 58.8% of the vote.

2022 

Trone again defeated Republican Neil Parrott with 54.8% of the vote.

Tenure

Trone was rated the 15th most bipartisan member of Congress by the Common Ground Committee and The Lugar Center rated Trone as the 23rd most bipartisan member of the U.S. House. As of October 2022, he had voted in line with Joe Biden's stated position 100% of the time. In January 2023, Trone had surgery and was absent for the 12th round of voting for speaker of the House; he returned while still wearing hospital clothes and voted in the 13th round.

Committee assignments
Committee on Appropriations
Subcommittee on Commerce, Justice, Science, and Related Agencies
Subcommittee on Transportation, Housing, and Urban Development, and Related Agencies 
Subcommittee on Military Construction, Veterans' Affairs, and Related Agencies
Committee on Veterans' Affairs
Subcommittee on Economic Opportunity
Subcommittee on Disability Assistance and Memorial Affairs
United States Congress Joint Economic Committee

Caucus memberships
New Democrat Coalition
Bipartisan Addiction and Mental Health Task Force
 House Pro-Choice Caucus

Political positions

Opioid epidemic 
Trone co-chairs the Bipartisan Addiction and Mental Health Task Force with Brian Fitzpatrick, a Republican congressman from Pennsylvania. According to The Washington Post, Trone “is at the center of bipartisan efforts in Congress to make a major investment in putting a dent in the opioid epidemic.” Driven by the loss of his nephew, he has made fighting the opioid epidemic one of his top priorities and drew praise from Fitzpatrick, who said that Trone "is the hardest-working person on the floor on this issue.” Most bills Trone has passed on the issue have been bipartisan.

Mental health 
On President Biden’s first day in office, Trone introduced the Preventing Mental Health and Substance Use Crises During Emergencies Act, which Trone said was needed because "we will never have a vaccine to cure the mental health [...] epidemic that [has] been exacerbated by this pandemic". After a police officer from his district died by suicide, Trone wrote the Confidentiality Opportunities for Peer Support (COPS) Counseling Act, which ensured confidential counseling for law enforcement officers. Biden signed the COPS Act into law in 2021.

Reparations
Trone is a co-sponsor of H.R. 40, the Commission to Study and Develop Reparation Proposals for African Americans Act. The bill would support identification of ways the government can address disparities between African Americans and other ethnic groups.

Gun policy
In 2022, Trone voted for H.R. 1808: Assault Weapons Ban of 2022.

Syria
In 2023, Trone voted against H.Con.Res. 21 which directed President Joe Biden to remove U.S. troops from Syria within 180 days.

Electoral history

Philanthropy 
In addition to political contributions, Trone and his wife have supported a number of philanthropic efforts. They have been major contributors to the ACLU since 1994. Their $15 million donation in 2015 supported the ACLU's efforts to promote criminal justice reform and improve employment opportunities for former prisoners, and established the Trone Center for Justice and Equality at the ACLU's national headquarters. In 2016, the couple pledged $5 million to establish the Trone Family Public Policy Initiative Fund at their alma mater, the Wharton School of the University of Pennsylvania.

In mid-2017, the Trones donated $2.5 million to Bethesda, Maryland's Suburban Hospital to support mental and behavioral health services and make improvements to the Old Georgetown Road campus. Their donation was inspired by their nephew's death from an opioid overdose in late 2016. The David and June Trone Family Foundation contributed $100,000 to the Catholic Legal Immigration Network in 2017 to support locals affected by Trump's travel ban, which the couple called "outrageously egregious". The Trones also donated to the ACLU's Montgomery County affiliate, the Latino immigrant organization CASA, and Interfaith Works.

Trone's contributions to Furman University include a $5 million grant for a student center and to create men's and women's lacrosse teams, and the lead $500,000 gift for the Riley Foundation's endowment to support disadvantaged South Carolina students. The Trone Student Center was dedicated in 2013 and named for Trone and his wife, in honor of their $3.5 million contribution.

In 2021, Trone and his wife donated $5 million to American University to help support research on addiction and behavioral health.

In 2022, Trone and his wife donated $10 million to his alma mater, Furman University, targeting mental health. Officials at Furman University said $8.5 million of the donation would be dedicated to renovating Furman's counseling center, creating the Trone Family Fund for Student Mental Health and Well-Being, and expanding the school's mental health services. Trone also donated $1.5 million to create the Hillel Endowment Fund to support Furman's Hillel, the Jewish Student Association.

Personal life 
Trone chairs the Trone Private Sector and Education Advisory Council at the ACLU Trone Center. He has served on the Bullis School's board of trustees since 2006.

In 2012, Kids Enjoy Exercise Now (KEEN) Greater DC gave Trone the Distinguished Service Award for his contributions to the organization, which provides recreational programs for children with developmental and physical disabilities. He was honored at the 2014 Ernst & Young Entrepreneur of the Year Awards Greater Washington, in the "large company" category. In 2015, Trone was invited by the American University's Kennedy Political Union and the Kogod School of Business to speak to students and faculty about entrepreneurship and business leadership. He was awarded the Anti-Defamation League's annual achievement award in 2016. In 2016, Trone joined the boards of American University and the Montgomery County Chamber of Commerce.

In 2017, Trone received Furman University's Carl F. Kohrt Distinguished Alumni Award, which is presented "to an alumnus in recognition of significant professional or personal accomplishments and in gratitude for continued loyalty". He served on Furman University's board of trustees from 2010 to 2016.

During his 2018 campaign, Trone was diagnosed with cancer and underwent chemotherapy and surgery to remove a kidney; he was declared cancer-free by October.

, the Trones live in Potomac, a suburb of Washington. His home is just outside the 6th's borders. Members of the House are required to live in the state they represent, not the particular district.

Trone was raised Lutheran. His wife and all four children are Jewish and attend Temple Beth Ami in Rockville.

See also 
 List of people from Potomac, Maryland

References

Further reading

External links 

 Congressman David Trone official U.S. House website
David Trone for Congress

 
 

1955 births
Living people
20th-century American businesspeople
21st-century American businesspeople
American company founders
American philanthropists
American retail chief executives
Businesspeople from Maryland
Democratic Party members of the United States House of Representatives from Maryland
Furman University alumni
People from Adams County, Pennsylvania
People from Potomac, Maryland
Retail company founders
Wharton School of the University of Pennsylvania alumni